Qantas Airways Limited is the flag carrier of Australia and the country's largest airline by fleet size, international flights, and international destinations. It is  the second oldest airline still in operation, having been founded in November 1920; it began international passenger flights in May 1935. Qantas is an acronym of the airline's original name, Queensland and Northern Territory Aerial Services, as it originally served Queensland and the Northern Territory, and is popularly nicknamed "The Flying Kangaroo". Qantas is a founding member of the Oneworld airline alliance.

The airline is based in the Sydney suburb of Mascot, adjacent to its main hub at Sydney Airport. , Qantas had a 65 per cent share of the Australian domestic market and carried 14.9 per cent of all passengers travelling into and out of Australia. Various subsidiary airlines operate to regional centres and on some trunk routes within Australia under the QantasLink banner. Qantas also owns Jetstar, a low-cost airline that operates both international services from Australia and domestic services within Australia and New Zealand; and holds stakes in a number of other Jetstar-branded airlines.

History

Qantas was founded in Winton, Queensland on 16 November 1920 by Hudson Fysh, Paul McGinness and Fergus McMaster as Queensland and Northern Territory Aerial Services Limited. The airline's first aircraft was an Avro 504K. It moved its headquarters to Longreach, Queensland in 1921 and Brisbane, Queensland in 1930.

QEA era
In 1934, QANTAS and Britain's Imperial Airways (a forerunner of British Airways) formed a new company, Qantas Empire Airways Limited (QEA). The new airline commenced operations in December 1934, flying between Brisbane and Darwin. QEA flew internationally from May 1935, when the service from Darwin was extended to Singapore (Imperial Airways operated the rest of the service through to London). When World War II began, enemy action and accidents destroyed half of the fleet of ten, and most of the fleet was taken over by the Australian government for war service.

Flying boat services were resumed in 1943, with flights between the Swan River at Crawley in Perth, Western Australia and Koggala Lake in Ceylon (now Sri Lanka). This linked up with the British Overseas Airways Corporation (BOAC, the successor airline to Imperial Airways) service to London. Qantas' kangaroo logo was first used on the "Kangaroo Route", begun in 1944, from Sydney to Karachi, where BOAC crews took over for the rest of the journey to the UK.

In 1947, QEA was nationalised by the Australian government led by Labor Prime Minister Ben Chifley. QANTAS Limited was then wound up. After nationalisation, Qantas' remaining domestic network, in Queensland, was transferred to the also nationally owned Trans-Australia Airlines, leaving Qantas with a purely international network. Shortly after nationalisation, QEA began its first services outside the British Empire, to Tokyo. Services to Hong Kong began around the same time. In 1957 a head office, Qantas House, opened in Sydney.

Jet age
In June 1959, Qantas entered the jet age when the first Boeing 707–138 was delivered. On , Qantas merged with nationally owned domestic airline Australian Airlines (renamed from Trans-Australia Airlines in 1986). The airline started to be rebranded as Qantas in the following year. Qantas was gradually privatised between 1993 and 1997. Under legislation passed to allow the privatisation, Qantas must be at least 51% owned by Australian shareholders.

Oneworld and Jetstar
In 1998, Qantas co-founded the Oneworld alliance with American Airlines, British Airways, Canadian Airlines, and Cathay Pacific, with other airlines joining subsequently.

With the entry of new discount airline Virgin Blue (now Virgin Australia) into the domestic market in 2000, Qantas' market share fell. Qantas created the budget Jetstar in 2001 to compete. The main domestic competitor to Qantas, Ansett Australia, collapsed on 14 September 2001. Market share for Qantas immediately neared 90%, but competition with Virgin increased as it expanded; the market share of the Qantas Group eventually settled at a relatively stable position of about 65%, with 30% for Virgin and other regional airlines accounting for the rest of the market.

2001–2019 developments
Qantas briefly revived the Australian Airlines name for a short-lived international budget airline between 2002 and 2006, but this subsidiary was shut down in favour of expanding Jetstar internationally, including to New Zealand. In 2004, the Qantas group expanded into the Asian budget airline market with Jetstar Asia Airways, in which Qantas owns a minority stake. A similar model was used for the investment into Jetstar Pacific, headquartered in Vietnam, in 2007, and Jetstar Japan, launched in 2012.

In December 2006, Qantas was the subject of a failed bid from a consortium calling itself Airline Partners Australia. Merger talks with British Airways in 2008 also did not proceed to an agreement. In 2011, industrial relations dispute between Qantas and the Transport Workers Union of Australia resulted in the grounding of all Qantas aircraft and lock-out of the airline's staff for two days.

On 25 March 2018, a Qantas Boeing 787 scheduled non-stop commercial flight between Australia and Europe connecting the two continents by air for the first time, with the inaugural arrival in London of Flight 9 (QF9). QF9 was a 17-hour, 14,498 km (9,009-mile) journey from Perth Airport in Western Australia to London Heathrow.

On 20 October 2019, Qantas Airways completed the longest commercial flight to date between New York City and Sydney using Boeing 787–9 Dreamliner in 19 hours and 20 minutes.

2020s
On 19 March 2020, Qantas confirmed it would suspend about 60% of domestic flights, put two thirds of its employees on leave, suspend all international flights and ground more than 150 of its aircraft from the end of March until at least 31 May 2020 following expanded government travel restrictions due to the COVID-19 pandemic. To survive the pandemic, Qantas announced that it would be axing 6,000 jobs and announced a plan to raise A$1.9 billion in new capital. Qantas also announced it would be offloading its 30% stake in Jetstar Pacific to Vietnam Airlines, hence retiring the Jetstar brand in Vietnam.

Qantas retired its last Boeing 747 in July 2020 after almost 49 years of continuous operation—the first 747 was inducted in August 1971, while all twelve Airbus A380s were placed in storage (ten at Mojave Air & Space Port and two at Los Angeles International Airport) for a minimum of three years. The pilots of the last Boeing 747 flight to Mojave Desert via Los Angeles traced the shape of the iconic Qantas logo in the flight path before the jet continued on its journey.

In November 2020, Qantas announced that the company will ask for proof of COVID-19 vaccination from international travelers. According to Alan Joyce, the firm's CEO, a coronavirus vaccine would become a "necessity" when travelling, "We are looking at changing our terms and conditions to say for international travellers, we will ask people to have a vaccination before they can get on the aircraft." Qantas also announced that it will cut 2000 jobs trying to limit its financial losses.

In August 2021, Qantas announced that it would require all of its 22,000 employees to be fully vaccinated against the virus.

In May 2022, Qantas ordered twelve A350-1000 planes from Airbus to be used in non-stop flights from Sydney to London in late 2025. In the same month, Qantas agreed terms to purchase Alliance Airlines. The deal is currently subjected to regulatory and shareholder approval.
In August 2022, Qantas Airways announced plans to compete in June 2023 with Air New Zealand on the non-stop Auckland—New York route, which Qantas would originate in Sydney before converting the flight in 2025 to a non-stop Sydney—New York route as part of Project Sunrise, through which Qantas aims to eliminate the "tyranny of distance" by developing non-stop flight routes connecting Australian cities to New York City, and also to London.

In February 2023, Qantas announced soaring profits for the second half of 2022, after experiencing losses due to Covid.

Destinations

Qantas operates flightseeing charters to Antarctica on behalf of Croydon Travel. It first flew Antarctic flightseeing trips in 1977. They were suspended for a number of years due to the crash of Air New Zealand Flight 901 on Mount Erebus in 1979. Qantas restarted the flights in 1994. Although these flights do not touch down, they require specific polar operations and crew training due to factors like sector whiteout, which contributed to the 1979 Air New Zealand disaster.

With Flights 7 and 8 – a non-stop service between Sydney and Dallas/Fort Worth operated by the Airbus A380 – commencing on 29 September 2014, Qantas operated the world's longest passenger flight on the world's largest passenger aircraft. This was overtaken on 1 March 2016 by Emirates' new Auckland-Dubai service. After it ordered Boeing 787 aircraft, Qantas announced an intention to launch non-stop flights between Australia and the United Kingdom during March 2018 from Perth to London. The inaugural flight left Perth on 24 March.

On 19 March 2020, Qantas confirmed it would suspend all international flights and about 60% of domestic flights from the end of March until at least 31 May 2020 following expanded government travel restrictions due to the COVID-19 pandemic.

Codeshare agreements
, Qantas had codeshare agreements with the following airlines:

 Aircalin
 Air France
 Air New Zealand
 Air Niugini
 Airnorth
 Air Tahiti Nui
 Air Vanuatu
 Alaska Airlines
 American Airlines
 Asiana Airlines
 Bangkok Airways
 British Airways
 Cathay Pacific
 China Airlines
 China Eastern Airlines
 China Southern Airlines
 El Al
 Emirates
 Fiji Airways
 Finnair
 Indigo
 ITA Airways
 Japan Airlines
 Jetstar
 Jetstar Asia
 Jetstar Japan
 Jetstar Pacific
 KLM
 LATAM Chile
 Solomon Airlines
 SriLankan Airlines
 Vietnam Airlines
 WestJet

Joint ventures
In addition to the above codeshares, Qantas has entered into joint ventures with the following airlines:
American Airlines
China Eastern Airlines
Emirates

Fleet

Current fleet 
, Qantas and its subsidiaries operated 323 aircraft, including 75 aircraft by Jetstar Airways; 109 by the various QantasLink-branded airlines and 15 by Express Freighters Australia (on behalf of Qantas Freight, which also wet leases two Atlas Air Boeing 747-400Fs).

Company heads 
The company heads of Qantas Airways Limited are only listed following 1993, when Qantas became a public company, following the Australian Government's move to privatise the remaining 75% of the company. Throughout Qantas' history, since 1920, there have been many forms, brandings and names until its current form was established in 1993.

Corporate affairs

Business trends
The key trends for the Qantas Group (Qantas Airways Ltd and Controlled Entities, which includes Jetstar and Qantas Cargo), are shown below (as at year ending 30 June):

In late February 2021 Qantas reported a half-year revenue loss of  A$1.08 billion. Revenue fell by 75 per cent to A$2.3 billion, passenger numbers fell by 83 per cent.

Headquarters

Qantas' headquarters are located at the Qantas Centre in the suburb of Mascot, Sydney, New South Wales. The headquarters underwent a redevelopment which was completed in December 2013.

Airline subsidiaries
Qantas has operated a number of passenger airline subsidiaries since inception, including:

 Australia Asia Airlines – operated from 1990 to 1996 to allow Qantas to serve the Taiwanese market
 Impulse Airlines – an established airline bought by Qantas in 2001; ceased operations the same year and its assets used to establish Jetstar Airways
 Australian Airlines – an international budget airline operated from 2002 to 2006
 QantasLink – Qantas' regional airline brand encompassing the operations of four Qantas subsidiary airlines (Eastern Australia Airlines, National Jet Systems, Network Aviation and Sunstate Airlines) and a contract carrier
 Jetstar – currently operating as Qantas' low-cost carrier
 Jetconnect – a wholly owned Qantas subsidiary established in 2002 that focused on trans-Tasman travel between New Zealand and Eastern Australia cities (Brisbane, Melbourne, and Sydney); the last of Jetconnect's aircraft were transferred to the mainline fleet in October 2018

Qantas operates a freight service under the name Qantas Freight (which uses aircraft operated by Qantas subsidiary Express Freighters Australia and also leases aircraft from Atlas Air) and also wholly owns the logistics-and-air-freight company Australian airExpress.

Aboriginal and Torres Strait Islanders initiatives
Qantas, through its Aboriginal and Torres Strait Islander Programme, has some links with the Aboriginal Australian community. In the Qantas Reconciliation Action Plan 2015 – 2018, Qantas revealed that 1 percent of all their staff are Aboriginal or Torres Strait Islander. Qantas employs a full-time Diversity Coordinator, who is responsible for the programme.

Qantas has also bought and donated Aboriginal art. An installation at its passenger lounge in Brisbane features a painting by Jenna Lee. Qantas has had a number of its planes painted with the art of Aboriginal artist Emily Kame Kngwarreye and others with art inspired by Rene Kulitja and Paddy Bedford.

Promotions and Sponsorships

An early television campaign, starting in 1969 and running for several decades, was aimed at American audiences; it featured a live koala, voiced by Howard Morris, who complained that too many tourists were coming to Australia and concluded "I hate Qantas." The koala ads have been ranked among the greatest commercials of all time. A long-running advertising campaign features renditions by children's choirs of Peter Allen's "I Still Call Australia Home", at various famous landmarks in Australia and foreign locations such as Venice. The song has also been used in Qantas's safety videos since 2018.

Qantas is the main sponsor of the Australia national rugby union team. It also sponsors the Socceroos, Australia's national association football team. Qantas was the naming rights sponsor for the Formula One Australian Grand Prix from 2010 until 2012. On 26 December 2011, Qantas signed a four-year deal with Australian cricket's governing body Cricket Australia, to be the official carrier of the Australia national cricket team.

Qantas management has expressed strong support for Marriage Equality and LGBTIQ issues, with CEO Alan Joyce said to be, "arguably the most prominent corporate voice in the marriage equality campaign." As official airline partner for the Sydney Mardi Gras, Qantas decorated one of its aircraft with rainbow wording and positioned a rainbow flag next to the tail's flying kangaroo. Qantas also served pride cookies to its passengers. It had a rainbow roo float in the Mardi Gras parade. There has been criticism of Qantas using its corporate power to prosecute the private interests on their staff and the community. Peter Dutton has said that chief executives such as Alan Joyce at Qantas should "stick to their knitting" rather than using the company's brand to advocate for political causes. A senior church leader has made similar comments. Despite the criticism, Qantas will continue to advocate for marriage equality which will include offering customers specially commissioned rings with the phrase, "until we all belong". This phrase will also appear on Qantas boarding passes and other paraphernalia. The cost of the campaign by Qantas and other participating companies is expected to be more than $5 million.

Joyce has pledged Qantas will, "continue social-justice campaigning". In relation to Israel Folau, sacked by Rugby Australia which is financially supported by Qantas, following his social media postings on homosexuality.

Fundamental structural change
In August 2011, the company announced that following financial losses of A$200 million ($209 million) for the year ending June 2011 and a decline in market share, major structural changes would be made. One planned change that did not come to fruition was the plan to create a new Asia-based premium airline that would operate under a different name. In addition to this plan, Qantas announced it planned to cut 1,000 jobs. The reforms included route changes, in particular the cessation of services to London via Hong Kong and Bangkok. While Qantas still operated in these cities, onward flights to London would be via its Oneworld partner British Airways under a code-share service.
The following year Qantas reported an A$245 million full-year loss to the end of June 2012, citing high fuel prices, intense competition and industrial disputes. This was the first full year loss since Qantas was fully privatised 17 years previously, in 1995, and led to the airline cancelling its order of 35 new Boeing 787 aircraft, to reduce its spending. Qantas subsequently divested itself of its 50% holding of StarTrack, Australia's largest road freight company, in part for acquiring full interest in Australian airExpress. On 26 March 2012, Qantas set up Jetstar Hong Kong with China Eastern Airlines Corporation, which was intended to begin flights in 2013, but became embroiled in a protracted approval process.

Qantas and Emirates began an alliance on 31 March 2013, in which their combined carriers offered 98 flights per week to Dubai, that saw bookings up six-fold. In September 2013, following the announcement the carrier expected another A$250 million ( million) net loss for the half-year period that ended on 31 December and the implementation of further cost-cutting measures that would see the cut of 1,000 jobs within a year, S&P downgraded Qantas credit from BBB- (the lowest investment grade) to BB+. Moody's applied a similar downgrading a month later.

Losses continued into 2014 reporting year, with the Qantas Group reporting a half year loss of A$235 million ( million) and eventual full year loss of A$2.84 billion. In February 2014 additional cost-cutting measures to save A$2 billion, including the loss of 5,000 jobs that will see the workforce lowered from 32,000 to 27,000 by 2017 were announced. In May 2014 the company stated it expected to shed 2,200 jobs by June 2014, including those of 100 pilots. The carrier also reduced the size of its fleet by retiring aircraft and deferring deliveries; and planned to sell some of its assets. With 2,200 employees laid off by June 2014, another 1,800 job positions were planned to be cut by June 2015. Also during 2014 the Qantas Sale Act, under which the airline was privatised, was amended to repeal parts of section 7. That act limits foreign ownership of Qantas to 49 percent, with foreign airlines subject to further restrictions, including a 35-percent limit for all foreign airline shareholdings combined. In addition, a single foreign entity can hold no more than 25 percent of the airline's shares.

The airline returned to profit in 2015, announcing a A$557 million after tax profit in August 2015, in contrast with a A$2.84 billion loss the year earlier. In 2015, Qantas sold its lease of Terminal 3 at Sydney Airport, which was due to continue until 2019, back to Sydney Airport Corporation for $535 million. This meant Sydney Airport resumed operational responsibility of the terminal, including the lucrative retail areas.

Design, hospitality, and lifestyle

Design 
Beginning in the early 2000s Qantas began working with industrial designer Marc Newson on aircraft seating and cabin interiors, product design, and first-class lounges. This collaboration resulted in the introduction of the Skybed business class seat in 2003 and led to Newson being named as the first Creative Director of Qantas in 2006. Newson was responsible for the design of the Qantas A380 fleet which first entered service in 2008, as well as the Sydney first class lounge. Subsequently, Newson protégé David Caon was engaged to design the Boeing 787-9 Dreamliner cabins and seating, as well as new first-class and business class lounges, furniture, and accessories. Furniture and accessories designed for Qantas first-class lounges and in-flight service has been manufactured by companies such as Poltrona Frau, Cappellini, Alessi, Tai Ping, and Noritake. Qantas has received many awards for design.

Catering 
Australian chef and entrepreneur Neil Perry, owner of Sydney's Margaret and Rockpool Bar & Grill restaurants, has been responsible for the in-flight and ground based culinary offerings of the airline since becoming the director of food, beverage, and service in 1997. In 2022, to celebrate the 25-year collaboration with Perry, Qantas reintroduced a selection of his most popular inflight and lounge dishes.

Uniform

Paris-based Australian designer Martin Grant is responsible for the new Qantas airline staff uniforms that were publicly unveiled on 16 April 2013. These were to replace the previous uniforms, dubbed colloquially as "Morrissey" by staff after the designer, Peter Morrissey. The new outfits combine the colours of navy blue, red and fuchsia pink. Qantas chief executive Alan Joyce stated that the new design "speaks of Australian style on the global stage" at the launch event that involved Qantas employees modelling the uniforms. Grant consulted with Qantas staff members over the course of one year to finalise the 35 styles that were eventually created. Not all employees were happy with the new uniform, however, with one flight attendant being quoted as saying "The uniforms are really tight and they are simply not practical for the very physical job we have to do." In 2020 Grant also designed a Qantas branded athleisure-wear collection.

Liveries

Indigenous Art liveries
Two Qantas aircraft are currently decorated with an Indigenous Australian art scheme. One aircraft, a Boeing 737–800, wears a livery called Mendoowoorrji, which was revealed in November 2013. The design was drawn from the late West Australian Aboriginal artist Paddy Bedford.

A Boeing 787–9 Dreamliner is adorned in a paint scheme inspired by the late Emily Kame Kngwarreye's 1991 painting Yam Dreaming. The adaptation of Yam Dreaming to the aircraft, led by Balarinji, a Sydney-based and Aboriginal-owned design firm, incorporates the red Qantas tailfin into the design, which includes white dots with red and orange tones. The design depicts the yam plant, an important and culturally significant symbol in Kngwarreye's Dreaming stories, and a staple food source in her home region of Utopia. The design was applied to the aircraft during manufacture, prior to its delivery in March 2018 to Alice Springs Airport, situated 230 kilometers southeast of Utopia, where the aircraft was met by Kngwarreye's descendants, the local community, and Qantas executives. The aircraft would later operate Qantas' inaugural nonstop services between Perth and London Heathrow, and between Melbourne and San Francisco, scheduled with Boeing 787 aircraft.

Australian Aboriginal art designs have previously adorned some Qantas aircraft; the first design was called Wunala Dreaming, which was unveiled in 1994 and had been painted on now-retired Boeing 747–400 and 747-400ER aircraft between 1994 and 2012. The motif was an overall-red design depicting ancestral spirits in the form of kangaroos travelling in the outback.

The second design was called Nalanji Dreaming and was depicted on a Boeing 747–300 from 1995 until its retirement in 2005. Nalanji Dreaming was a bright blue design inspired by rainforest landscape and tropical seas.

The third design was titled Yananyi Dreaming, and featured a depiction of Uluru. The scheme was designed by Uluru-based artist Rene Kulitja, in collaboration with Balarinji. It was painted on the 737 at the Boeing factory prior to its delivery in 2002. It was repainted into the standard livery in 2014.

Retro Roo liveries

In November 2014 the airline revealed that the 75th Boeing 737–800 jet to be delivered would carry a 'retro-livery' based on the airline's 1971 'ochre' colour scheme design featuring the iconic 'Flying Kangaroo' on its tail and other aspects drawn from its 1970s fleet. The aircraft was delivered on 17 November.

Qantas announced a second 737–800 would receive a 'retro roo' livery in October 2015. On 16 November 2015 the airline unveiled the second 'retro roo' 737, bearing a replica livery from 1959 to celebrate the airline's 95th birthday.

Other liveries
Several Qantas aircraft have been decorated with promotional liveries, promoting telecommunications company Optus; the Disney motion picture Planes; the Australian national association football team, the Socceroos; and the Australian national rugby union team, the Wallabies. Two aircraft – an Airbus A330-200 and a Boeing 747-400ER – were decorated with special liveries promoting the Oneworld airline alliance (of which Qantas is a member) in 2009. On 29 September 2014, nonstop Airbus A380 service to Dallas/Fort Worth International Airport was inaugurated using an A380 decorated with a commemorative cowboy hat and bandana on the kangaroo tail logo. Prior to the 2017 Sydney Mardi Gras, Qantas decorated one of its Airbus A330-300 aircraft with rainbow lettering and depicted a rainbow flag on the tail of the aircraft.

Cabin

Domestic
Qantas domestic flights are primarily operated by Boeing 737-800 and Airbus A330-200 aircraft; Airbus A330-300s sometimes operate domestically as well. A two-class configuration (Business and Economy) is offered.

Business
Domestic Business Class is offered on all Boeing 737 and Airbus A330 aircraft. On the Boeing 737, Business is exclusively available in the first three rows of the cabin, with a seat configuration of 2–2, seat recline, and a larger pitch between seats. As the A330s operate international flights, Business Suites are sometimes available on domestic routes. These seats feature all-aisle access in a 1-2-1 configuration and a fully flat  bed.

Economy
Domestic Economy Class is offered on all Boeing 737 and Airbus A330 aircraft. Layouts are 3–3 on the 737 and 2-4-2 on the A330.

International
Qantas international flights are primarily operated on Airbus A380s, A330-300s, Boeing 787s, and sometimes on Airbus A330-200s and Boeing 737-800s. Passenger class configuration varies by aircraft, with the Airbus A330-300 offering a two-class configuration of Business and Economy on short to medium-haul flights. This compares to the Airbus A380, which offers a four-class configuration of First, Business, Premium Economy, and Economy on selected long haul flights.

First

First class is offered exclusively on the Airbus A380.

It offers 14 individual suites in a 1-1-1 layout. Each suite has a  widescreen HD monitor with 1,000 AVOD programs. In addition to 110 V AC power outlets, USB ports are offered for connectivity. Passengers are also able to make use of the on-board business lounge on the upper deck. Complimentary access to both the first class and business class lounges (or affiliated lounges) is offered.

Updated versions of this seat were fitted to the airline's refurbished Airbus A380 aircraft from late 2019. This seat featured refreshed cushioning and larger entertainment screens compared to the older version seat.

Business
International Business class is offered on all Qantas mainline passenger aircraft.

On all International and selected Domestic flights, Qantas offers two different types of Business Class seats, as listed below.

Business Suites

Business Suites are offered on all Boeing 787, Airbus A330-300, and selected Airbus A380 aircraft.

These seats include beds and are in a 1-2-1 configuration. The Business Suite was introduced on the A330 in October 2014, and also contains a bed. This seat includes a Panasonic eX3 system with a touchscreen. By the end of 2016, the business class seats of Qantas' entire Airbus A330 fleet were refitted. Airbus A330 Business Suites are available on Asian routes, transcontinental routes across Australia and smaller routes such as the East Coast triangle.

Updated versions of this seat were fitted to the airline's new Boeing 787 fleet from late 2017.

Business Skybeds

Business Skybeds are offered exclusively on selected A380 aircraft.

On the Airbus A380, 64 fully-flat Skybed seats are available with  seat pitch (converting to a 200 cm long bed). These seats are located on the upper deck in a 2-2-2 configuration in two separate cabins. Features include a 30 cm touchscreen monitor with 1,000 AVOD programmes and an on-board lounge. Airbus A380 Business Skybeds are available on Qantas' flagship routes such as Australia to/from London via Singapore, Los Angeles, Dallas, and Hong Kong (seasonal).

The Skybed 1 (Mark I) version of the lie-flat seats, featured between 2003 and 2019 had  of seat pitch and  width; however passengers slept at a distinct slope to the cabin floor. The Skybed 2 (Mark II) version, introduced in 2008 has a  pitch, and allows passengers to lie fully horizontal.

On the now-retired Boeing 747, seating was in a 2-3-2 configuration on the main deck and a 2–2 configuration on the upper deck. Skybed seats on Boeing 747s featured a  touchscreen monitor with 400 AVOD programs. Before their retirement, Boeing 747 Business Skybeds were available on Asian, African, and South American routes.

In 2019, Qantas began the process of retrofitting its Airbus A380 aircraft with new Business Suites as offered on Airbus A330 and Boeing 787 aircraft. The aircraft will gain six business class seats compared to the previous configuration.

Complimentary access to the Qantas business class lounge (or affiliated lounges) is also offered.

Premium Economy

Premium economy class is offered on all Airbus A380 and Boeing 787–9 aircraft.

On the Boeing 787, it is configured in a 2-3-2 seating arrangement around the middle of the aircraft, whereas it is in a 2-3-2 seating arrangement at the rear of the upper deck on the A380. The total number of seats depends on the aircraft type, as A380s have 35–60 seats, (depending on the configuration) and 787s have 28 seats.

Qantas premium economy is presented as a lighter business class product rather than most other airlines' premium economy, which is often presented as a higher economy class, however Qantas premium economy does not offer access to premium lounges, and meals are only a slightly uprated version of economy class meals.

In 2019, Qantas began the process of retrofitting its Airbus A380 aircraft with new Premium Economy seats, as offered on Boeing 787 aircraft. The aircraft will gain 25 premium economy seats compared to the previous configuration.

Economy

International Economy class is available on all Qantas mainline passenger aircraft.

Layouts are 3–3 on the 737, 2-4-2 on the A330, and 3-3-3 on the B787-9. On the A380, the layout is 3-4-3 and there are four self-service snack bars located in between cabins.

In 2019, Qantas began the process of retrofitting its Airbus A380 aircraft which includes new Economy seats with new seat cushions and improved inflight entertainment, as offered on Airbus A330 and Boeing 787 aircraft. The aircraft will have fewer economy seats compared to the previous configuration due to an increase in the number of premium seats.

In-flight entertainment

Every Qantas mainline aircraft has some form of video audio entertainment. Qantas has several types of in-flight entertainment (IFE) systems installed on its aircraft and refers to the in-flight experience as "On:Q".

Audio-video entertainment systems 
The "Total Entertainment System" by Rockwell Collins was featured on selected domestic and international aircraft between 2000 and 2019. This AVOD system included personal LCD screens in all classes, located in the seat back for economy and business class, and in the armrest for premium economy and first class.

The Mainscreen System is featured on selected Boeing 737–800 aircraft. This entertainment system, introduced between 2002 and 2011, has overhead video screens as the main form of entertainment. Movies are shown on the screens for lengthier flights or TV programmes on shorter flights. A news telecast will usually feature at the start of the flight. Audio options are less varied than on Q, iQ or the Total Entertainment System.

The "iQ" inflight entertainment system by Panasonic Avionics Corporation is featured on all Boeing 747, and selected Airbus A380 and Boeing 737–800 aircraft. This audio video on demand (AVOD) experience, introduced in 2008, is based on the Panasonic Avionics system and features expanded entertainment options; touch screens; and new communications-related features such as Wi-Fi and mobile phone functionality; as well as increased support for electronics (such as USB and iPod connectivity).

The "Q" inflight entertainment system by Panasonic Avionics Corporation in collaboration with Massive Interactive is featured on all Airbus A330-300, A330-200, Boeing 787 and selected Airbus A380 aircraft. This audio video on demand (AVOD) experience, introduced in 2014 and updated in 2018 on selected aircraft, is based on the Panasonic eX3 system and features extensive entertainment options; enhanced touch screens; and communications-related features such as Wi-Fi and mobile phone functionality; as well as increased support for electronics (such as USB and iPod connectivity). A "my flight" feature offers access to maps, playlists, and a service timeline showing when drinks and meals will be served and the best time for resting on long-haul flights.

Wireless entertainment systems and Wi-Fi 
Q Streaming is an in-flight entertainment system in which entertainment is streamed to iPads or personal devices available in all classes on selected aircraft. A selection of movies, TV, music, and a kids' choice are available.

In 2007, Qantas conducted a trial for use of mobile telephones with AeroMobile, during domestic services for three months on a Boeing 767. During the trial, passengers were allowed to send and receive text messages and emails but were not able to make or receive calls.

Since 2014, Sky News Australia has provided multiple news bulletins both in-flight and in Qantas branded lounges. Previously, the Australian Nine Network provided a news bulletin for Qantas entitled Nine's Qantas Inflight News, which was the same broadcast as Nine's Early Morning News, however Nine lost the contract to Sky News.

In July 2015, Qantas signed a deal with American cable network HBO to provide over 120 hours of television programming in-flight from the network which will be updated monthly, as well as original lifestyle and entertainment programming from both Foxtel and the National Geographic Channel. In August 2022, it was announced that the airline had partnered with Network 10 owner Paramount to launch the Paramount+ service on its in-flight entertainment systems.

In 2017 Qantas commenced rolling out complimentary high speed Wi-Fi on domestic aircraft. The services utilises NBN Co Sky Muster satellites to deliver higher speeds than generally offered by onboard Wi-Fi. Previously, in July 2007, Qantas announced that Wi-Fi would be available on its long haul A380s and 747-400s although that system ultimately did not proceed following trials.

Inflight magazine 
Qantas: The Australian Way is the airline's in-flight magazine. In mid-2015, the magazine ended a 14-year publishing deal with Bauer Media, switching its publisher to Medium Rare.

Services

The Qantas Club

Facilities

The Qantas Club is the airline lounge for Qantas with airport locations around Australia and the world. Additionally, Qantas operates dedicated international first-class lounges in Sydney, Melbourne, Auckland, Los Angeles and Singapore. Domestically, Qantas also offers dedicated Business Lounges at Sydney, Melbourne, Brisbane, Canberra and Perth for domestic Business Class, Qantas Platinum and Platinum One, and OneWorld Emerald frequent flyers.

In April 2013, Qantas opened its new flagship lounge in Singapore, the Qantas Singapore Lounge. This replaced the former separate first- and business-class lounges as a result of the new Emirates alliance. Similar combined lounges were also opened in Hong Kong in April 2014 and in Brisbane in October 2016. These new lounges provide the same service currently offered by Sofitel in its flagship First lounges in Sydney and Melbourne and a dining experience featuring Neil Perry's Spice Temple inspired dishes and signature cocktails.

Lounge access
Qantas Club Members, Gold Frequent Flyers, and Oneworld Sapphire holders are permitted to enter domestic Qantas Clubs when flying on Qantas or Jetstar flights along with one guest who need not be travelling. Platinum and Oneworld Emerald Members are permitted to bring in two guests who do not need to be travelling. Internationally, members use Qantas International Business Class lounges (or the Oneworld equivalent). Guests of the member must be travelling to gain access to international lounges. When flying with American Airlines, members have access to Admirals Club lounges and when flying on British Airways, members have access to British Airways' Terraces and Galleries Lounges.

Platinum Frequent Flyers had previously been able to access the Qantas Club in Australian domestic terminals at any time, regardless of whether they were flying that day. Travellers holding Oneworld Sapphire or Emerald status are also allowed in Qantas Club lounges worldwide.

Access to Qantas First lounges is open to passengers travelling on internationally operated Qantas or Oneworld first-class flights, as well as Qantas platinum and Oneworld emerald frequent flyers. Emirates first-class passengers are also eligible for access to the Qantas first lounges in Sydney and Melbourne.

The Qantas Club also offers membership by paid subscription (one, two, or four years) or by achievement of Gold or Platinum frequent flyer status. Benefits of membership include lounge access, priority check-in, priority luggage handling and increased luggage allowances.

Qantas Frequent Flyer

The Qantas frequent-flyer program is aimed at rewarding customer loyalty. The program is long-standing, although the date of the actual inception has been a matter that has generated some commentary. Qantas state the program launched in 1987 although other sources claim what is the current program was launched in the early 1990s, with a Captain's Club program existing before that.

Points are accrued based on distance flown, with bonuses that vary by travel class. Points can also be earned on other Oneworld airlines as well as through other non-airline partners. Points can be redeemed for flights or upgrades on flights operated by Qantas, Oneworld airlines, and other partners. Other partners include credit cards, car rental companies, hotels and many others. Flights with Qantas and selected partner airlines earn Status Credits — and accumulation of these allows progression to Silver status (Oneworld Ruby), Gold status (Oneworld Sapphire), Platinum and Platinum One status (Oneworld Emerald).

Membership of the program has grown significantly since 2000, when the program had 2.4 million members. By 2005 membership had grown to 4.3 million, then to 7.2 million by 2010 and 10.8 million in 2015. As at 2018, the program has 12.3 million members, or approaching the equivalent of half of the Australian population.

Qantas has faced criticism regarding availability of seats for members redeeming points. In 2004, the Australian Competition & Consumer Commission directed Qantas to provide greater disclosure to members regarding the availability of frequent-flyer seats.

In March 2008, an analyst at JPMorgan Chase suggested that the Qantas frequent-flyer program could be worth A$2 billion (US$1.9 billion), representing more than a quarter of the total market value of Qantas.

On 1 July 2008 a major overhaul of the program was announced. The two key new features of the program were Any Seat rewards, in which members could now redeem any seat on an aircraft, rather than just selected seats — at a price. The second new feature was Points Plus Pay, which has enabled members to use a combination of cash and points to redeem an award. Additionally, the Frequent Flyer store was also expanded to include a greater range of products and services.
Announcing the revamp, Qantas confirmed it would be seeking to raise about A$1 billion in 2008 by selling up to 40% of the frequent flyer program. However, in September 2008, it stated it would defer the float, citing volatile market conditions.

Accidents and incidents

It is often claimed that Qantas has never had an aircraft crash. While it is true that the company has neither lost a jet airliner nor had any jet fatalities, it had eight fatal accidents and an aircraft shot down between 1927 and 1945, with the loss of 63 people. Half of these accidents and the shoot-down occurred during World War II, when the Qantas aircraft were operating on behalf of Allied military forces. Post-war, it lost another four aircraft (one was owned by BOAC and operated by Qantas in a pooling arrangement) with a total of 21 people killed. The last fatal accidents suffered by Qantas were in 1951, with three fatal crashes in five months. Qantas' safety record allows the airline to be officially known as the world's safest airline for seven years in a row from 2012 until 2019 and again in 2021 and 2023. 

Since the end of World War II, the following accidents and incidents have occurred:
 On 23 March 1946, an Avro Lancastrian registered G-AGLX disappeared while flying over the Indian Ocean. The BOAC-owned aircraft was being operated by Qantas on the Karachi—Sydney part of the two airlines' joint service from London to Sydney. It disappeared with seven passengers and crew on board between Colombo, Ceylon (now Sri Lanka), and the Cocos (Keeling) Islands, approximately three hours before it was due to arrive at the Cocos islands.
 On 7 April 1949, an Avro Lancastrian registered VH-EAS swung on landing at Dubbo, New South Wales during a training flight, causing the gear to collapse. The aircraft was destroyed by fire, but the crew evacuated safely.
 On 16 July 1951, a de Havilland Australia DHA-3 Drover registered VH-EBQ crashed off the coast of New Guinea (in the Huon Gulf near the mouth of the Markham River) after the centre engine's propeller failed. The pilot and the six passengers on board were killed.
 On 21 September 1951, a de Havilland DH.84 Dragon registered VH-AXL, crashed in mountainous country southeast of Arona in the central highlands of New Guinea, no passengers were on board, the pilot was killed.
 On 13 December 1951, a de Havilland DH.84 Dragon registered VH-URV crashed in mountainous country near Mount Hagen, central highlands of New Guinea. The pilot and the two passengers were killed. To date, this was the last fatal accident suffered by Qantas.
 On 24 August 1960, a Lockheed L-1049 Super Constellation registered VH-EAC crashed on take-off at Mauritius en route to the Cocos Islands, Australia. The take-off was aborted following an engine failure, the aircraft ran off the runway, and was destroyed by fire. There were no fatalities.
 On 23 September 1999, Qantas Flight 1, a Boeing 747–400 registered VH-OJH, overran the runway while landing at Bangkok, Thailand, during a heavy thunderstorm. The aircraft came to a stop on a golf course, but without fatalities. The Australian Transport Safety Bureau criticised numerous inadequacies in Qantas' operational and training processes.
 On 25 July 2008, Qantas Flight 30, a Boeing 747–400 registered VH-OJK, suffered a ruptured fuselage and decompression as a result of an oxygen tank explosion over the South China Sea. En route from Hong Kong International Airport to Melbourne Airport, the aircraft made an emergency landing in the Philippines with no injuries.
 On 7 October 2008, an Airbus A330-300 registered VH-QPA, travelling from Singapore Changi Airport to Perth, Western Australia as Qantas Flight 72, suffered a rapid loss of altitude in two sudden uncommanded pitch down manoeuvres causing serious injuries while  from Learmonth. The aircraft safely landed in Learmonth, with 14 people requiring transportation by air ambulance to Perth. Another 30 people also required hospital treatment, while an additional 30 people had injuries not requiring hospital treatment. Initial investigations identified an inertial reference system fault in the Number-1 Air Data Inertial Reference Unit as the likely origin of the event. On receiving false indication of a very high angle of attack, the flight control systems commanded a pitch down movement, reaching a maximum of 8.5 degrees pitch down. The incident featured in a 7 News documentary.
 On 4 November 2010, Qantas Flight 32, an Airbus A380 registered VH-OQA, fitted with four Rolls-Royce Trent 972 engines, suffered an uncontained turbine disc failure of its left inboard engine shortly after taking off from Singapore Changi Airport en route to Sydney. The aircraft returned to Singapore and landed safely. None of the 440 passengers or 29 crew on board were injured.

Extortion attempts

On 26 May 1971 Qantas received a call from a "Mr. Brown" claiming that there was a bomb planted on a Hong Kong-bound jet and demanding $500,000 in unmarked $20 notes. The caller and threat were taken seriously when he directed police to an airport locker where a functional bomb was found. Arrangements were made to pick up the money in front of the head office of the airline in the heart of the Sydney business district. Qantas paid the money and it was collected, after which Mr. Brown called again, advising the "bomb on the plane" story was a hoax. The initial pursuit of the perpetrator was bungled by the New South Wales Police Force which, despite having been advised of the matter from the time of the first call, failed to establish adequate surveillance of the pick-up of the money. Directed not to use their radios (for fear of being "overheard"), the police were unable to communicate adequately. Tipped off by a still-unidentified informer, the police arrested an Englishman, Peter Macari, finding more than $138,000 hidden in an Annandale property. Convicted and sentenced to 15 years in prison, Macari served nine years before being deported to Britain. More than $224,000 remains unaccounted for. The 1986 telemovie Call Me Mr. Brown, directed by Scott Hicks and produced by Terry Jennings, relates to this incident. On 4 July 1997 a copycat extortion attempt was thwarted by police and Qantas security staff.

Controversies

Sex discrimination controversy

In November 2005 it was revealed that Qantas had a policy of not seating adult male passengers next to unaccompanied children. This led to accusations of discrimination. The policy came to light following an incident in 2004 when Mark Wolsay, who was seated next to a young boy on a Qantas flight in New Zealand, was asked to change seats with a female passenger. A steward informed him that "it was the airline's policy that only women were allowed to sit next to unaccompanied children". Cameron Murphy of the NSW Council for Civil Liberties president criticised the policy and stated that "there was no basis for the ban". He said it was wrong to assume that all adult males posed a danger to children. The policy has also been criticised for failing to take female abusers into consideration.

In 2010, when British Airways was successfully sued to change its child seating policy, Qantas argued again that banning men from sitting next to unaccompanied children "reflected parents' concerns". In August 2012, the controversy resurfaced when a male passenger had to swap seats with a female passenger after the crew noticed he was sitting next to an unrelated girl travelling alone. The man felt discriminated against and humiliated before the other passengers as a possible paedophile. A Qantas spokesman defended the policy as consistent with that of other airlines in Australia and around the globe.

Price fixing
In 2006 a class action lawsuit, alleging price-fixing on air cargo freight, was commenced in Australia. The lawsuit was settled early in 2011 with Qantas agreeing to pay in excess of $21 million to settle the case.

Qantas has pleaded guilty to participating in a cartel that fixed the price of air cargo. Qantas Airways Ltd. was fined CAD$155,000 after it admitted that its freight division fixed surcharges on cargo exported on certain routes from Canada between May 2002 and February 2006. In July 2007, Qantas pleaded guilty in the United States to price fixing and was fined a total of $61 million through the Department of Justice investigation. The executive in charge was jailed for six months. Other Qantas executives were granted immunity after the airline agreed to co-operate with authorities. In 2008 the Australian Competition & Consumer Commission fined the airline $20 million for breaches of the acts associated with protecting consumers. In November 2010 Qantas was fined 8.8 million euros for its part in an air cargo cartel involving up to 11 other airlines. Qantas was fined NZ$6.5 million in April 2011 when it pleaded guilty in the New Zealand High Court to the cartel operation.

2011 industrial unrest and grounding of fleet

In response to ongoing industrial unrest over failed negotiations involving three unions (the Australian Licensed Aircraft Engineers Association (ALAEA), the Australian and International Pilots Association (AIPA) and the Transport Workers Union of Australia (TWU)), the company grounded its entire domestic and international fleet from 5 pm AEDT on 29 October. Employees involved would be locked out from 8 p.m. AEDT on 31 October. It was reported that the grounding would have a daily financial impact of A$20 million. In the early hours of 31 October, Fair Work Australia ordered that all industrial action taken by Qantas and the involved trade unions be terminated immediately. The order was requested by the federal government amid fears that an extended period of grounding would do significant damage to the national economy, especially the tourism and mining sectors. The grounding affected an estimated 68,000 customers worldwide.

Asylum seeker deportations
Qantas has been subject to protests in relation to the deportation of asylum seekers, which led to disruptions of flights. In 2015 activists prevented the transfer of a Tamil man from Melbourne to Darwin (from where he was to be deported to Colombo) by refusing to take their seats on a Qantas flight. It was reported that Qantas banned the student from taking Qantas flights in the future. A nameless head of security from Qantas sent a letter to the Melbourne student's email account saying her "actions are unacceptable and will not be tolerated by the Qantas Group or the Jetstar Group". Also in 2015, another Tamil man was to be sent from Melbourne to Darwin to later be deported. A protest by the man led to him not being put on the plane. A spokesman for Qantas said flight QF838 was delayed almost two hours.  A spokesperson from Qantas stated that "[s]afety and security is the number-one priority for all airlines and an aircraft is not the right place for people to conduct protests." Campaigners also asked Qantas to rule out deporting Iraqi man Saeed in 2017. Campaigners have asked Qantas not to participate in the high-profile deportation case of the Nadesalingam family. In response a Qantas spokesperson stated: "We appreciate that this is a sensitive issue. The government and courts are best placed to make decisions on complex immigration matters, not airlines".

Complaints
In 2023, a report by the Australian Competition and Consumer Commission found that the airline was the subject of almost 2000 complaints over the previous year. The report found that complaints about the airline had risen by 70% from the previous year.

Awards 

 2004 Chicago Athenaeum Good Design Award (Qantas Skybed by Marc Newson)
 2007 LEAF International Design Award (Sydny First Class lounge by Marc Newson and Sébastien Segers)
 2009 Queensland Business Leaders Hall of Fame (Inaugural inductee)
 2010 Chicago Athenaeum Good Design Award (A380 First Class suite by Marc Newson)
 2009 Australian International Design Award of the Year (A380 Economy Class Seat by Marc Newson)
 2014 ADI Award (Qantas Singapore Lounge)
 2015 Australian Good Design Award (Qantas dinner box by Detmold Packaging)
 2019 Sydney Design Awards Gold (Balarinji-Qantas Emily Kame Kngwarreye 787-9 Dreamliner)
 2022 SkyTrax Awards
 2022 Designers Institute of New Zealand Award (Signage)

See also 
 The Double Sunrise
 List of airlines of Australia
 Qantas Founders Outback Museum
 Qantas House
 Transport in Australia
 Qantassaurus, a dinosaur named after the airline

Publications 

 Qantas August 2011 Investor Briefing: Building a Stronger Qantas Retrieved 25 August 2011
 Eames, Jim (2021). Red Tail Skies: A big book of Qantas Stories. AUS: Allen & Unwin. ISBN 9781761066627. OCLC 1284985394.
 Montagnana-Wallace, Neil (2021). The flying kangaroo: 100 years of Qantas. Preston, Victoria. ISBN 978-1-922419-39-2. OCLC 1258150569.

References

External links

 
 Qantas Facts – Official
 Qantas Ephemera at the National Library of Australia
 Original Qantas Logbook at the State Library Of Queensland
 QANTAS digital story and oral history: Queensland Business Leaders Hall of Fame 2009, State Library of Queensland

 
Airlines established in 1920
Australian brands
Companies based in Sydney
Former seaplane operators
Companies listed on the Australian Securities Exchange
Australian companies established in 1920